is a Japanese footballer.

Career statistics

Club
.

Notes

References

External links

1991 births
Living people
People from Shizuoka (city)
Association football people from Shizuoka Prefecture
Aichi Gakuin University alumni
Japanese footballers
Japanese expatriate footballers
Association football forwards
J3 League players
Fujieda MYFC players
Japanese expatriate sportspeople in Germany
Expatriate footballers in Germany